Hastula exacuminata is a species of sea snail.

Description
The Hastula exacuminata is a marine gastropod mollusc in the family Terebridae, the auger snails.

Distribution

References

Terebridae
Gastropods described in 1891